The Knobstone Trail is the longest hiking trail in Indiana. It currently ends at Delaney Creek Park near Salem, Indiana. Most of the trail lies within Clark State Forest. As it lies along the Knobstone Escarpment, it is a difficult hike, which is why many use the Knobstone Trail to prepare for hiking the Appalachian Trail.

It now runs , mostly through public forest.

The rugged trail consists of steep climbs and descents throughout its duration. It is maintained to backcountry standards. There are no designated camp sites; rather hikers must camp at least  from roads and trailheads.

After a tornado on March 2, 2012, destroyed 4.5 miles of the trail, sections of the trail were closed.  The damaged areas were reopened in early 2014.

Waypoints

Following are waypoints on the trail:

References

External links
Indiana DNR Knobstone Trail official site
Full trail on OpenStreetMap
Full trail downloadable GPX at Way Marked Trails
Hoosier Hiker's Council Knobstone Trail expansion project
Delaney Creek Park
Knobstone Trail in Indiana at Indianaoutfitters.com
Strange, Nathan D. . Bloomington: Indiana University Press, 2011.

Protected areas of Clark County, Indiana
Hiking trails in Indiana
Long-distance trails in the United States
Protected areas of Scott County, Indiana
Protected areas of Washington County, Indiana